Suchin Yen-arromn (born February 21, 1991) is a Thai professional footballer who plays as a goalkeeper for Thai League 2 club Lampang.

Honour
Nongbua Pitchaya
 Thai League 2 Champions : 2020–21

External links

1991 births
Living people
Suchin Yen-arrom
Suchin Yen-arrom
Association football goalkeepers
Suchin Yen-arrom
Suchin Yen-arrom
Suchin Yen-arrom
Suchin Yen-arrom
Suchin Yen-arrom
Suchin Yen-arrom